Faradaya is a genus of plants in the mint family, Lamiaceae, first described in 1865 by Victorian government botanist Ferdinand von Mueller in Fragmenta Phytographiae Australiae. Following a revision of the genera Oxera, Clerodendrum, Faradaya, and Hosea in 2015 the genus has been included in Oxera.

References

Lamiaceae
Lamiaceae genera